Massagris natalensis is a jumping spider species in the genus Massagris that lives in South Africa. It was first identified in 2009.

References

Endemic fauna of South Africa
Salticidae
Spiders described in 2009
Spiders of South Africa